Lesley B. Cormack (born 1957) is a Canadian historian of science and academic administrator specializing in the history of mathematics and of geography. She is the Deputy Vice-Chancellor and Principal of the University of British Columbia's Okanagan Campus.

Education and career
Cormack earned her Ph.D. at the University of Toronto in 1988. She was a faculty member at the University of Alberta until 2007, when she moved to Simon Fraser University as Dean of the Faculty of Arts and Social Sciences. She returned to Alberta as Dean of the Faculty of Arts in 2010, and moved to UBC Okanagan as Deputy Vice-Chancellor and Principal in 2020.

Recognition
Cormack became a corresponding member of the International Academy of the History of Science in 2010, and a full member in 2015.

Books
Cormack is the author or editor of books including:
Charting an Empire: Geography at the English Universities 1580-1620 (University of Chicago Press, 1997)
Making Contact: Maps, Identity, and Travel (edited with Glenn Burger, Jonathan Hart, and Natalia Pylypiuk, University of Alberta Press, 2003)
A History of Science in Society: From Philosophy to Utility (with Andrew Ede, 2 vols., Broadview Press, 2004; 2nd ed., University of Toronto Press, 2012;  3rd ed., 2016 and 2017)
Mathematical Practitioners and the Transformation of Natural Knowledge in Early Modern Europe (edited with Stephen A. Walton and John A. Schuster, Springer, 2017)

References

1957 births
Living people
20th-century Canadian historians
Canadian women historians
Historians of mathematics
Historians of science
Canadian mathematicians
Canadian women mathematicians
University of Toronto alumni
Academic staff of the University of Alberta
Academic staff of Simon Fraser University
Academic staff of the University of British Columbia
21st-century Canadian historians